Severance is a 2006 comedy horror film co-written and directed by Christopher Smith. Co-written with James Moran, it stars Danny Dyer and Laura Harris. The film tells a story of group of British and Canadian co-workers who go to a remote mountain forest in Hungary, where they become victims of murderous attacks by a group of poachers.

Severance received mostly positive reviews. In 2009, media interest in the film was revived following the alleged copycat murder of a UK teenager.

Plot

A man named George and two women are running through the woods. The women fall into a large pit trap while George is caught by a snare. As he hangs helplessly, a masked poacher approaches and disembowels him with a knife.

Some days prior, the European Sales division of Palisade Defence military arms corporation are on a bus to a team-building weekend at a lodge in the Mátra Mountains of Hungary. When a fallen tree blocking the road halts the bus's progress, the driver refuses to take a dirt road through the woods and, after an argument, drives off, leaving the group to walk the remaining distance to the lodge.

The lodge turns out to be old and in serious disrepair, but the manager, Richard, convinces them to enter. Inside, they discover a file cabinet full of cryptic Palisade documents, written in Russian. This leads Harris to relate a story he'd heard about the lodge: the lodge was previously a mental institution, and in the early 20th century a Palisade-made nerve gas was used to clear it out after the inmates took over. Jill responds with the story she'd heard: the lodge was a "reeducation center" for Russian war criminals and poachers, and after an escape a Palisade-made nerve gas was used to clear escapees out of nearby buildings. Both mention a lone survivor who swore revenge on Palisade. Steve starts to tell his own story about the lodge's past as a clinic staffed by busty nurses when he finds a human tooth in the meat pie the group is eating for dinner. Chastising Gordon for serving a pie he just found in the kitchen, everyone goes to bed.

That night Jill sees someone looking into the lodge from the trees. Though nobody is found outside, everyone but Richard agrees that they should leave the lodge. The next morning Richard grudgingly sends Harris and Jill to the top of the hill to call the bus driver back. Reaching the hill, the two find the bus abandoned and the driver dead in a nearby creek. Back at the lodge, Gordon steps into a bear trap. After several failed attempts by Steve and Billy to pry the trap open, Gordon's left leg is cut through completely under the knee. Harris and Jill arrive in the bus, load everyone in and head back for town. On the way, a spike strip is thrown in front of the bus, which causes it to crash. Harris is thrown clear of the bus in the crash, and is decapitated by a masked poacher with a machete. Jill is captured and tied to a tree, gagged, doused with gasoline, and burned alive. The rest discover Harris's body, prompting them to head back to the lodge for the night.

Gordon later gets captured. Discovering a newly opened door, the four head into the basement which leads to an underground prison. Through one door, they find the now-dead Gordon with the Palisade logo carved into his torso, and a poacher who fires a shotgun at them. They hide in a nearby cell, where Billy dies from a chest wound. Richard escapes out the back into the woods. While trying to kill the poacher, Maggie falls through the rickety floor. The poacher turns around and takes aim at Maggie, but Steve saves her by killing the attacker. Maggie takes the poacher’s shotgun and shoots him in the head.

Believing they are safe, Maggie and Steve exit the lodge, but discover several more armed, Russian-speaking poachers, awaiting them outside. The two run into the woods and encounter Richard, who has stepped on a Palisade-made land mine and cannot move without detonating it. Richard guides Maggie and Steve through the minefield. Meanwhile, the poachers use a fallen branch to pass over the minefield and torment Richard with insults and stones. Accepting his situation, Richard does his best to save the others and steps off the mine, killing himself as well as two of the poachers.

Steve and Maggie come to another building, the real Palisade lodge. Inside, they find their boss George, who is partying with two escorts Steve ordered earlier. George brings out a prototype missile launcher and fires it at the approaching poachers, but the missile locks on to a passing commercial jet instead, destroying it. The five run into the woods, leading to the events shown in the beginning of the film.

Maggie and Steve are left to fight the poachers with what they have at hand. At one point, Maggie breaks her leg, but is saved when one of the escorts, rescued by Steve, arrives and shoots their attacker. Steve, Maggie and the escorts make it to a rowboat, and as they paddle off to safety Steve jokingly quips, "Foursome?"

Cast
Laura Harris as Maggie
Claudie Blakley as Jill
Toby Stephens as Harris
Andy Nyman as Gordon
Babou Ceesay as Billy
Tim McInnerny as Richard
Danny Dyer as Steve
David Gilliam as George
Juli Drajkó as Olga
Judit Viktor as Nadia
Sándor Boros as Coach Driver

Release

Home video
Severance was released in the United Kingdom on DVD by 20th Century Fox Home Entertainment on 8 January 2007. In the United States it was released on DVD by Magnolia Pictures on 27 September 2007. Severance has also been released on DVD in Australia by Warner Home Video, in France by Fox Pathé Europa, in Germany by Splendid Film and in Hong Kong by Deltamac.

Reception

Severance received generally favorable reviews. The film holds an approval rating of 64% on the film critic site Rotten Tomatoes based on 89 reviews, with an average rating of 6.1/10. The consensus reads: "A twisted and bloody spoof on office life, Severance nicely balances comedy and nasty horror." On Metacritic, the film holds a score of 62 out of 100 sampled from 23 critics' reviews, indicating "generally favorable reviews".

Peter Travers of Rolling Stone commended Smith's "mischievous blending [of] The Office with Friday the 13th", awarding the film three stars out of four. Peter Bradshaw of The Guardian gave not such a positive review, saying, "It is being billed as Deliverance meets The Office – a tellingly misleading description," giving the film only two out of five stars. In 2012, Total Film ranked it as the 36th best independent horror film of all time.

Connections
Mentioned in the film, the CRM-114 land mine is a reference to the CRM-114 radio discriminator in Dr. Strangelove. Severance and Dr. Strangelove both end with the song "We'll Meet Again".

On 28 April 2009, the BBC reported that the murder of a 17-year-old student from Norfolk was allegedly based on a scene from the film. According to the BBC news report, "Norwich Crown Court was told how Simon Everitt, from Great Yarmouth, was tied up and petrol poured down his throat before he was set on fire. Simon's body was found in woodland at Mautby in June 2008." Jurors at the trial of Jonathan Clarke and two other co-defendants were played a scene from Severance and told that, when Mr. Clarke had watched the DVD, "he made a comment to this effect: 'Wouldn't it be wicked if you could actually do that to someone in real life?'" On 29 May 2009, the trio were convicted of Everitt's murder.

See also
Deliverance
Survival film, about the film genre, with a list of related films

References

External links

2006 comedy horror films
2006 films
2006 horror films
Backwoods slasher films
British comedy horror films
English-language German films
German comedy horror films
Films set in Hungary
Films directed by Christopher Smith
Qwerty Films films
UK Film Council films
2006 comedy films
Obscenity controversies in film
Film controversies in the United Kingdom
2000s British films
2000s German films